In linguistics, a compound is a lexeme (less precisely, a word or sign) that consists of more than one stem. Compounding, composition or nominal composition is the process of word formation that creates compound lexemes. Compounding occurs when two or more words or signs are joined to make a longer word or sign. A compound that uses a space rather than a hyphen or concatenation is called an open compound or a spaced compound; the alternative is a closed compound.

The meaning of the compound may be similar to or different from the meaning of its components in isolation. The component stems of a compound may be of the same part of speech—as in the case of the English word footpath, composed of the two nouns foot and path—or they may belong to different parts of speech, as in the case of the English word blackbird, composed of the adjective black and the noun bird.  With very few exceptions, English compound words are stressed on their first component stem.

As a member of the Germanic family of languages, English is unusual in that even simple compounds made since the 18th century tend to be written in separate parts. This would be an error in other Germanic languages such as Norwegian, Swedish, Danish, German, and Dutch. However, this is merely an orthographic convention: As in other Germanic languages, arbitrary noun phrases, for example "girl scout troop", "city council member", and "cellar door", can be made up on the spot and used as compound nouns in English too.

For example, German "Donaudampfschifffahrtsgesellschaftskapitän" would be written in English as "Danube steamship company captain" and not as "Danubesteamshipcompanycaptain".

The process occurs readily in all Germanic languages for different reasons.  Words can be concatenated both to mean the same as the sum of two words (e.g. ) or where an adjective and noun are compounded (e.g. ). This can create a plethora of large, but valid words in these languages, by compounding compound words with several more.

The addition of affix morphemes to words (such as suffixes or prefixes, as in employ → employment) should not be confused with nominal composition, as this is actually morphological derivation.

Some languages easily form compounds from what in other languages would be a multi-word expression.

Sign languages also have compounds. They are created by combining two or more sign stems.

So-called "classical compounds" are compounds derived from classical Latin or ancient Greek roots.

Formation of compounds
Compound formation rules vary widely across language types.

In a synthetic language, the relationship between the elements of a compound may be marked with a case or other morpheme. Conversely, in the Hebrew language compound, the word בֵּית סֵפֶר  (school), it is the head that is modified: the compound literally means "house-of book", with בַּיִת  (house) having entered the construct state to become בֵּית  (house-of). This latter pattern is common throughout the Semitic languages, though in some it is combined with an explicit genitive case, so that both parts of the compound are marked, e.g. Arabic عبد الله ʕabd-u l-lāh-i (servant-NOM DEF-god-GEN) "servant of-the-god: the servant of God".

Agglutinative languages tend to create very long words with derivational morphemes. Compounds may or may not require the use of derivational morphemes also. In German, extremely 
extendable compound words can be found in the language of chemical compounds, where, in the cases of biochemistry and polymers, they can be practically unlimited in length, mostly because the German rule suggests combining all noun adjuncts with the noun as the last stem. German examples include  (color television set),  (radio remote control), and the often quoted jocular word  (originally only two Fs, Danube-Steamboat-Shipping Company captain['s] hat), which can of course be made even longer and even more absurd, e.g. Donau­dampfschifffahrts­gesellschafts­kapitänsmützen­reinigungs­ausschreibungs­verordnungs­diskussionsanfang ("beginning of the discussion of a regulation on tendering of Danube steamboat shipping company captain hats") etc. According to several editions of the Guinness Book of World Records, the longest published German word has 79 letters and is  Donau­dampfschiffahrts­elektrizitäten­hauptbetriebswerkbau­unterbeamten­gesellschaft ("Association for Subordinate Officials of the Main Electric[ity] Maintenance Building of the Danube Steam Shipping"), but there is no evidence that this association ever actually existed.

In Finnish, although there is theoretically no limit to the length of compound words, words consisting of more than three components are rare. Internet folklore sometimes suggests that  (Airplane jet turbine engine auxiliary mechanic non-commissioned officer student) is the longest word in Finnish, but evidence of it actually being used is scant and anecdotal at best.

Compounds can be rather long when translating technical documents from English to some other language, since the lengths of the words are theoretically unlimited, especially in chemical terminology.

Subclasses

Semantic classification

A common semantic classification of compounds yields four types:

endocentric
exocentric
copulative
appositional

An endocentric compound (tatpuruṣa in the Sanskrit tradition) consists of a head, i.e. the categorical part that contains the basic meaning of the whole compound, and modifiers, which restrict this meaning. For example, the English compound doghouse, where house is the head and dog is the modifier, is understood as a house intended for a dog. Endocentric compounds tend to be of the same part of speech (word class) as their head, as in the case of doghouse.

An exocentric compound (bahuvrihi in the Sanskrit tradition) is a hyponym of some unexpressed semantic category (such as a person, plant, or animal): none (neither) of its components can be perceived as a formal head, and its meaning often cannot be transparently guessed from its constituent parts. For example, the English compound white-collar is neither a kind of collar nor a white thing. In an exocentric compound, the word class is determined lexically, disregarding the class of the constituents. For example, a must-have is not a verb but a noun. The meaning of this type of compound can be glossed as "(one) whose B is A", where B is the second element of the compound and A the first. A bahuvrihi compound is one whose nature is expressed by neither of the words: thus a white-collar person is neither white nor a collar (the collar's colour is a metonym for socioeconomic status). Other English examples include barefoot.

Copulative compounds (dvandva in the Sanskrit tradition) are compounds with two semantic heads, for example in a gradual scale (such a mix of colours).

Appositional compounds are lexemes that have two (contrary or simultaneous) attributes that classify the compound.

Syntactic classification

Noun–noun compounds
All natural languages have compound nouns. The positioning of the words (i.e. the most common order of constituents in phrases where nouns are modified by adjectives, by possessors, by other nouns, etc.) varies according to the language. While Germanic languages, for example, are left-branching when it comes to noun phrases (the modifiers come before the head), the Romance languages are usually right-branching.

In English, compound nouns can be open, hyphenated, or solid, and they sometimes change orthographically in that direction over time, reflecting a semantic identity that evolves from a mere collocation to something stronger in its unification. This theme has been summarized in usage guides under the aphorism that "compound nouns tend to solidify as they age"; thus, child bearing becomes childbearing, or a noun such as street car begins as open in most attestations and then becomes street-car and eventually streetcar; see English compound § Compound nouns for more information. German, a fellow West Germanic language, has a somewhat different orthography, whereby compound nouns are virtually always required to be solid or at least hyphenated; even the hyphenated styling is used less now than it was in centuries past. 

In French, compound nouns are often formed by left-hand heads with prepositional components inserted before the modifier, as in chemin-de-fer 'railway', lit. 'road of iron', and moulin à vent 'windmill', lit. 'mill (that works)-by-means-of wind'.

In Turkish, one way of forming compound nouns is as follows: yeldeğirmeni 'windmill' (yel: wind, değirmen-i: mill-possessive); demiryolu 'railway' (demir: iron, yol-u: road-possessive).

Occasionally, two synonymous nouns can form a compound noun, resulting in a tautology. One example is the English word pathway.

Verb–noun compounds
A type of compound that is fairly common in the Indo-European languages is formed of a verb and its object, and in effect transforms a simple verbal clause into a noun.

In Spanish, for example, such compounds consist of a verb conjugated for the second person singular imperative followed by a noun (singular or plural): e.g., rascacielos (modelled on "skyscraper", lit. 'scratch skies'), sacacorchos 'corkscrew' (lit. 'pull corks'), guardarropa 'wardrobe' (lit. 'store clothes'). These compounds are formally invariable in the plural (but in many cases they have been reanalyzed as plural forms, and a singular form has appeared). French and Italian have these same compounds with the noun in the singular form: Italian grattacielo 'skyscraper', French grille-pain 'toaster' (lit. 'toast bread').

This construction exists in English, generally with the verb and noun both in uninflected form: examples are spoilsport, killjoy, breakfast, cutthroat, pickpocket, dreadnought, and know-nothing.

Also common in English is another type of verb–noun (or noun–verb) compound, in which an argument of the verb is incorporated into the verb, which is then usually turned into a gerund, such as breastfeeding, finger-pointing, etc. The noun is often an instrumental complement. From these gerunds new verbs can be made: (a mother) breastfeeds (a child) and from them new compounds mother-child breastfeeding, etc.

Verb-noun compounds derived from classical languages tend to be nouns; rarely, a verb-noun classical compound can be a verb. One example is miscegenate, a word that literally falls into disuse nowadays, which is derived from a Latin verb and a Latin noun. In the Australian Aboriginal language Jingulu, a Pama–Nyungan language, it is claimed that all verbs are V+N compounds, such as "do a sleep", or "run a dive", and the language has only three basic verbs: do, make, and run.

A special kind of compounding is incorporation, of which noun incorporation into a verbal root (as in English backstabbing, breastfeed, etc.) is most prevalent (see below).

Verb–verb compounds

Verb–verb compounds are sequences of more than one verb acting together to determine clause structure. They have two types:

In a serial verb, two actions, often sequential, are expressed in a single clause. For example, Ewe trɔ dzo, lit. "turn leave", means "turn and leave", and Hindi  jā-kar dekh-o, lit. "go-CONJUNCTIVE PARTICIPLE see-IMPERATIVE", means "go and see". In Tamil, a Dravidian language, van̪t̪u paːr, lit. "come see". In each case, the two verbs together determine the semantics and argument structure.

Serial verb expressions in English may include What did you go and do that for?, or He just upped and left; this is however not quite a true compound since they are connected by a conjunction and the second missing arguments may be taken as a case of ellipsis.

In a compound verb (or complex predicate), one of the verbs is the primary, and determines the primary semantics and also the argument structure. The secondary verb, often called a vector verb or explicator, provides fine distinctions, usually in temporality or aspect, and also carries the inflection (tense and/or agreement markers). The main verb usually appears in conjunctive participial (sometimes zero) form. For examples, Hindi  nikal gayā, lit. "exit went", means 'went out', while निकल पड़ा nikal paRā, lit. "exit fell", means 'departed' or 'was blurted out'. In these examples निकल nikal is the primary verb, and गया gayā and पड़ा paRā are the vector verbs. Similarly, in both English start reading and Japanese 読み始める yomihajimeru "read-CONJUNCTIVE-start" "start reading", the vector verbs start and 始める hajimeru "start" change according to tense, negation, and the like, while the main verbs reading and 読み yomi "reading" usually remain the same. An exception to this is the passive voice, in which both English and Japanese modify the main verb, i.e. start to be read and 読まれ始める yomarehajimeru lit. "read-PASSIVE-(CONJUNCTIVE)-start" start to be read. With a few exceptions, all compound verbs alternate with their simple counterparts. That is, removing the vector does not affect grammaticality at all nor the meaning very much: निकला nikalā '(He) went out.' In a few languages both components of the compound verb can be finite forms: Kurukh kecc-ar ker-ar lit. "died-3pl went-3pl" '(They) died.'
Compound verbs are very common in some languages, such as the northern Indo-Aryan languages Hindustani and Punjabi, and Dravidian languages like Tamil, where as many as 20% of verb forms in running text are compound. They exist but are less common in other Indo-Aryan languages like Marathi and Nepali, in Tibeto-Burman languages like Limbu and Newari, in Turkic languages like Turkish and Kyrgyz, in Korean and Japanese, and in northeast Caucasian languages like Tsez and Avar.
Under the influence of a Quichua substrate speakers living in the Ecuadorian altiplano have innovated compound verbs in Spanish:
De rabia puso rompiendo la olla, 'In anger (he/she) smashed the pot.' (Lit. from anger put breaking the pot)
 Botaremos matándote 'We will kill you.' (Cf. Quichua huañuchi-shpa shitashun, lit. kill-CP throw.1plFut.
Likewise in Hindi: तेरे को मार डालेंगे tere ko mār DāleNge, lit. "we will kill-throw you").

Compound verb equivalents in English (examples from the internet):
What did you go and do that for?
If you are not giving away free information on your web site then a huge proportion of your business is just upping and leaving.
Big Pig, she took and built herself a house out of brush.
Caution: In descriptions of Persian and other Iranian languages the term 'compound verb' refers to noun-plus-verb compounds, not to the verb–verb compounds discussed here.

Parasynthetic compounds
Parasynthetic compounds are formed by a combination of compounding and derivation, with multiple lexical stems and a derivational affix. For example, English black-eyed is composed of black, eye, and -ed 'having', with the meaning 'having a black eye'; Italian imbustare is composed of in- 'in', busta 'envelope', -are (verbal suffix), with the meaning 'to put into an envelope'.

Compound adpositions
Compound prepositions formed by prepositions and nouns are common in English and the Romance languages (consider English on top of, Spanish encima de, etc.). Hindi has a small number of simple (i.e., one-word) postpositions and a large number of compound postpositions, mostly consisting of simple postposition ke followed by a specific postposition (e.g., ke pas, "near"; ke nīche, "underneath").

Examples from different languages
Chinese (traditional/simplified Chinese; Standard Chinese Pinyin/Cantonese Jyutping):
學生/学生 'student': 學 xué/hok6 learn + 生 shēng/sang1  living being
太空/太空 'space': 太 tài/taai3 great + 空 kōng/hung1 emptiness
摩天樓/摩天楼 'skyscraper': 摩 mó/mo1 touch + 天 tiān/tin1 sky + 樓 lóu/lau2 building (with more than 1 storey)
打印機/打印机 'printer': 打 dǎ/daa2 strike + 印 yìn/yan3 stamp/print + 機 jī/gei1 machine
百科全書/百科全书 'encyclopaedia': 百 bǎi/baak3 hundred + 科 kē/fo1 (branch of) study + 全 quán/cyun4 entire/complete + 書 shū/syu1 book
謝謝/谢谢 'thanks': Repeating of 謝 xiè thank

Dutch:
 'disability insurance':  'labour' +  'inaptitude' +  'insurance'.
 'sewage treatment plant':  'sewer' + water 'water' +  'cleaning' +  'installation'.
 'birthday calendar':  'birthday' +  'calendar'.
 'customer service representative':  'customers' +  'service' +  'worker'.
 'university library':  'university' +  'library'.
 'possibilities for advancement':  'through' +  'grow' +  'possibilities'.

Finnish:
 'dictionary':  'word' +  'book'
 'computer':  'knowledge data' +  'machine'
 'Wednesday':  'middle' +  'week'
 'world':  'land' +  'air'
 'railway station':  'iron' +  'road' +  'station'
 'electricity meter': 'three-phase kilowatt hour meter'

German:
 'skyscraper':  'clouds' +  'scraper'
 'railway':  'iron' +  'track'
 'automobile':  'power' +  'drive' +  'machinery'
 'barbed wire':  'barb/barbed' +  'wire'
: literally cattle-marking- and beef-labeling-supervision-duties-delegation law

Ancient Greek:
 philosopher: φίλος phílos 'beloved' + σοφία sophíā 'wisdom'
 dēmokratíā 'democracy': δῆμος dêmos 'people' + κράτος 'rule'
 rhododáktylos 'rose-fingered': ῥόδον rhódon 'rose' + δάκτυλος dáktylos 'finger' (a Homeric epithet applied to the Dawn)

Icelandic:
 'railway':  'iron' +  'path' or 'way'
 'vehicle': farar 'journey' + tæki 'apparatus'
 'encyclopedia':  'everything' +  'study' or 'knowledge' +  'dictionary' ( 'words' +  'book')
 'telephone conversation': sím 'telephone' + tal 'dialogue'

Italian:
 'centipede':  'thousand' +  'feet'
 'railway':  'iron' +  'way'
 'windscreen wiper':  'to wash' +  'crystal (pane of) glass'
pomodoro: pomo d'oro = apple of Gold = tomatoes
portacenere = porta cenere = ashtray

Japanese:
目覚まし（時計）  'alarm clock': 目 me 'eye' + 覚まし samashi (-zamashi) 'awakening (someone)' (+ 時計 tokei (-dokei) clock)
お好み焼き okonomiyaki: お好み okonomi 'preference' + 焼き yaki 'cooking'
日帰り higaeri 'day trip': 日 hi 'day' + 帰り kaeri (-gaeri) 'returning (home)'
国会議事堂  'national diet building': 国会 kokkai 'national diet' + 議事  'proceedings' + 堂 dō 'hall'

Korean:
안팎 anpak 'inside and outside': 안 an 'inside' + 밖 bak 'outside' (As two nouns compound the consonant sound 'b' fortifies into 'p' becoming 안팎 anpak rather than 안밖 )

Ojibwe/Anishinaabemowin:
mashkikiwaaboo 'tonic': mashkiki 'medicine' + waaboo 'liquid'
miskomin 'raspberry': misko 'red' + miin 'berry'
dibik-giizis 'moon': dibik 'night' + giizis 'sun'
gichi-mookomaan 'white person/American': gichi 'big' + mookomaan 'knife'

Spanish:
 'science fiction': , 'science', + , 'fiction' (This word is a calque from the English expression science fiction. In English, the head of a compound word is the last morpheme: science fiction. Conversely, the Spanish head is located at the front, so ciencia ficción sounds like a kind of fictional science rather than scientific fiction.)
 'centipede':  'hundred' +  'feet'
 'railway':  'iron' +  'lane'
    'umbrella':  'stops' +  '(the) water'
   'keeping the head low in a bad mood': cabeza 'head' + bajo 'down'
    'seesaw' (contraction of  'goes up and down')
 'windshield wiper' is a nested compound:  'clean' +  windshield, which is itself a compound of  'stop' +  'breezes'.

Tamil:
 In Cemmozhi (Classical Tamil), rules for compounding are laid down in grammars such as Tolkappiyam and Nannūl, in various forms, under the name punarcci. Examples of compounds include kopuram from 'kō' (king) + 'puram' (exterior). Sometimes phonemes may be inserted during the blending process such as in kovil from 'kō' (king) + 'il' (home). Other types are like vennai (butter) from 'veḷḷai' (white) + 'nei' (ghee); note how 'veḷḷai' becomes 'ven'.
 In koṭuntamizh (Non-standard Tamil), parts of words from other languages may be morphed into Tamil. Common examples include 'ratta-azhuttam' (blood pressure) from the Sanskrit rakta (blood) and Cemmozhi 'azhuttam' (pressure); note how rakta becomes ratta in Tamil order to remove the consonant-cluster. This also happens with English, for examples kāpi-kaṭai (coffee shop) is from English coffee, which becomes kāpi in Tamil, and the Tamil kaṭai meaning shop.

Tłįchǫ Yatiì/Dogrib:
dlòotsǫ̀ǫ̀ 'peanut butter': dlòo 'squirrel' + tsǫ̀ǫ̀ 'dung'
eyakǫ̀ 'hospital: eya 'sick' + kǫ̀ 'house'dè gotłeè 'kerosene': dè 'land' + gotłeè 'its fat'dǫ łèt'è 'bannock': dǫ '[Aboriginal] people' + łèt'è 'bread'

 Germanic languages 
In Germanic languages (including English), compounds are formed by prepending what is effectively a namespace (disambiguation context) to the main word. For example, "football" would be a "ball" in the "foot" context. In itself, this does not alter the meaning of the main word. The added context only makes it more precise. As such, a "football" must be understood as a "ball". However, as is the case with "football", a well established compound word may have gained a special meaning in the language's vocabulary. Only this defines "football" as a particular type of ball (unambiguously the round object, not the dance party, at that), and also the game involving such a ball. Another example of special and altered meaning is "starfish" – a starfish is in fact not a fish in modern biology. Also syntactically, the compound word behaves like the main word – the whole compound word (or phrase) inherits the word class and inflection rules of the main word. That is to say, since "fish" and "shape" are nouns, "starfish" and "star shape" must also be nouns, and they must take plural forms as "starfish" and "star shapes", definite singular forms as "the starfish" and "the star shape", and so on. This principle also holds for languages that express definiteness by inflection (as in North Germanic).

Because a compound is understood as a word in its own right, it may in turn be used in new compounds, so forming an arbitrarily long word is trivial. This contrasts to Romance languages, where prepositions are more used to specify word relationships instead of concatenating the words. As a member of the Germanic family of languages, English is unusual in that compounds are normally written in separate parts. This would be an error in other Germanic languages such as Norwegian, Swedish, Danish, German and Dutch. However, this is merely an orthographic convention: As in other Germanic languages, arbitrary noun phrases, for example "girl scout troop", "city council member", and "cellar door", can be made up on the spot and used as compound nouns in English too.

Russian language
In the Russian language compounding is a common type of word formation, and several types of compounds exist, both in terms of compounded parts of speech and of the way of the formation of a compound.

Compound nouns may be agglutinative compounds, hyphenated compounds (стол-книга 'folding table', lit. 'table-book', "book-like table"), or abbreviated compounds (acronyms: колхоз 'kolkhoz'). Some compounds look like acronym, while in fact they are an agglutinations of type stem + word: Академгородок 'Akademgorodok' (from akademichesky gorodok 'academic village'). In agglutinative compound nouns, an agglutinating infix is typically used: пароход 'steamship': пар + о + ход. Compound nouns may be created as noun+noun, adjective + noun, noun + adjective (rare), noun + verb (or, rather, noun + verbal noun).

Compound adjectives may be formed either per se (бело-розовый 'white-pink') or as a result of compounding during the derivation of an adjective from a multi-word term: Каменноостровский проспект 'Stone Island Avenue', a street in St.Petersburg.

Reduplication in Russian is also a source of compounds.

Quite a few Russian words are borrowed from other languages in an already-compounded form, including numerous "classical compounds" or internationalisms: автомобиль 'automobile'.

Sanskrit language

Sanskrit is very rich in compound formation with seven major compound types and as many as 55 sub-types. The compound formation process is productive, so it is not possible to list all Sanskrit compounds in a dictionary. Compounds of two or three words are more frequent, but longer compounds with some running through pages are not rare in Sanskrit literature. Some examples are below (hyphens below show individual word boundaries for ease of reading but are not required in original Sanskrit).
हिमालय (IAST Himālaya, decomposed as hima-ālaya): Name of the Himalaya mountain range. Literally the abode of snow. A compound of two words and four syllables.
प्रवर-मुकुट-मणि-मरीचि-मञ्जरी-चय-चर्चित-चरण-युगल (IAST pravara-mukuṭa-maṇi-marīci-mañjarī-caya-carcita-caraṇa-yugala): Literally, O the one whose dual feet are covered by the cluster of brilliant rays from the gems of the best crowns, from the Sanskrit work Panchatantra. A compound of nine words and 25 syllables.
कमला-कुच-कुङ्कुम-पिञ्जरीकृत-वक्षः-स्थल-विराजित-महा-कौस्तुभ-मणि-मरीचि-माला-निराकृत-त्रि-भुवन-तिमिर (IAST kamalā-kuca-kuṅkuma-piñjarīkṛta-vakṣaḥ-sthala-virājita-mahā-kaustubha-maṇi-marīci-mālā-nirākṛta-tri-bhuvana-timira): Literally O the one who dispels the darkness of three worlds by the shine of Kaustubha jewel hanging on the chest, which has been made reddish-yellow by the saffron from the bosom of Kamalā (Lakshmi), an adjective of Rama in the Kakabhushundi Rāmāyaṇa. A compound of 16 words and 44 syllables.
साङ्ख्य-योग-न्याय-वैशेषिक-पूर्व-मीमांसा-वेदान्त-नारद-शाण्डिल्य-भक्ति-सूत्र-गीता-वाल्मीकीय-रामायण-भागवतादि-सिद्धान्त-बोध-पुरः-सर-समधिकृताशेष-तुलसी-दास-साहित्य-सौहित्य-स्वाध्याय-प्रवचन-व्याख्यान-परम-प्रवीणाः (IAST sāṅkhya-yoga-nyāya-vaiśeṣika-pūrva-mīmāṃsā-vedānta-nārada-śāṇḍilya-bhakti-sūtra-gītā-vālmīkīya-rāmāyaṇa-bhāgavatādi-siddhānta-bodha-puraḥ-sara-samadhikṛtāśeṣa-tulasī-dāsa-sāhitya-sauhitya-svādhyāya-pravacana-vyākhyāna-parama-pravīṇāḥ): Literally the acclaimed forerunner in understanding of the canons of Sāṅkhya, Yoga, Nyāya, Vaiśeṣika, Pūrva Mīmāṃsā, Vedānta, Nārada Bhakti Sūtra, Śāṇḍilya Bhakti Sūtra, Bhagavad Gītā, the Ramayana of Vālmīki, Śrīmadbhāgavata; and the most skilled in comprehensive self-study, discoursing and expounding of the complete works of Gosvāmī Tulasīdāsa. An adjective used in a panegyric of Jagadguru Rambhadracharya. The hyphens show only those word boundaries where there is no sandhi. On including word boundaries with sandhi (vedānta=veda-anta, rāmāyaṇa=rāma-ayana, bhāgavatādi=bhāgavata-ādi, siddhānta=siddha-anta, samadhikṛtāśeṣa=samadhikṛta-aśeṣa, svādhyāya=sva-adhyāya), this is a compound of 35 words and 86 syllables.

 Sign languages 
Also in sign languages, compounding is a productive word formation process. Both endocentric and exocentric compounds have been described for a variety of sign languages. Copulative compounds or dvandva, which are composed of two or more nouns from the same semantic category to denote that semantic category, also occur regularly in many sign languages. The sign for parents in Italian Sign Language, for instance, is a combination of the nouns ‘father’ and ‘mother’. The sign for breakfast  in American Sign Language follows the same concept. The words eat and morning are signed together to create a new word meaning breakfast. This is an example of a sequential compound; in sign languages, it is also possible to form simultaneous compounds, where one hand represents one lexeme while the other simultaneously represents another lexeme. An example is the sign for weekend in Sign Language of the Netherlands, which is produced by simultaneously signing a one-handed version of the sign for Saturday and a one-handed version of the sign for Sunday. In American Sign Language there is another process easily compared to compounding. Blending is the blending of two morphemes to create a new word called a portmanteau. This is different from compounding in that it breaks the strict linear order of compounding. 

Recent trends in orthography
Although there is no universally agreed-upon guideline regarding the use of compound words in the English language, in recent decades written English has displayed a noticeable trend towards increased use of compounds. Recently, many words have been made by taking syllables of words and compounding them, such as pixel (picture element) and bit (binary digit). This is called a syllabic abbreviation.

In Dutch and the Scandinavian languages there is an unofficial trend toward splitting compound words, known in Norwegian as særskriving, in Swedish as särskrivning (literally "separate writing"), and in Dutch as Engelse ziekte (the "English disease"). Because the Dutch language and the Scandinavian languages rely heavily on the distinction between the compound word and the sequence of the separate words it consists of, this has serious implications. For example, the Danish adjective røykfritt (literally "smokefree", meaning no smoking allowed) if separated into its composite parts, would mean røyk fritt ("smoke freely"). In Dutch, compounds written with spaces may also be confused, but can also be interpreted as a sequence of a noun and a genitive (which is unmarked in Dutch) in formal abbreviated writing. This may lead to, for example, commissie vergadering ("commission meeting") being read as "commission of the meeting" rather than "meeting of the commission" (normally spelled commissievergadering).

The German spelling reform of 1996 introduced the option of hyphenating compound nouns when it enhances comprehensibility and readability. This is done mostly with very long compound words by separating them into two or more smaller compounds, like Eisenbahn-Unterführung (railway underpass) or Kraftfahrzeugs-Betriebsanleitung (car manual). Such practice is also permitted in other Germanic languages, e.g. Danish and Norwegian (Bokmål and Nynorsk alike), and is even encouraged between parts of the word that have very different pronunciation, such as when one part is a loan word or an acronym.

Compounding by language
Classical compounds
English compounds
German compounds
Sanskrit compounds

See also
 Compound modifier
 Bracketing paradox
 Etymological calque
 Genitive connector
 Incorporation (linguistics)
 Kenning
 Multiword expression
 Neologism
 Noun adjunct
 Phono-semantic matching
 Portmanteau compounds
 Status constructus
 Syllabic abbreviation
 Tweebuffelsmeteenskootmorsdoodgeskietfontein, South African placename
 Word formation
 Univerbation: a phrase becomes a word

Notes

References
Kortmann, Bernd: English Linguistics: Essentials, Cornelsen, Berlin 2005.
 The Oxford Handbook of Compounding, eds. Lieber, Rochelle & Pavol Štekauer, 2009. Oxford: Oxford University Press.
Plag, Ingo: Word-formation in English, Cambridge University Press, Cambridge 2003.
Scalise Sergio & Irene Vogel (eds.) (2010), Cross-Disciplinary Issues in Compounding'', Amsterdam, Benjamins.

External links 

 Compound word, encyclopedia.com
 Compounds and multi-word expressions in the languages of Europe by Rita Finkbeiner and Barbara Schlücker, 2019
 Compounds and multi-word expressions in English by Laurie Bauer, 2019
 Compounds and multi-word expressions in Finnish by Irma Hyvärinen, 2019
 Compounds and multi-word expressions in French by Kristel Van Goethem, 2018
 Compounds and multi-word expressions in German by Barbara Schlücker, 2019
 Compounds and multi-word expressions in Greek by Maria Koliopoulou, 2019
 Compounds and multi-word expressions in Hungarian by Ferenc Kiefer, 2019
 Compounds and multi-word expressions in Italian by Francesca Masini, 2019
 Compounds and multi-word expressions in Polish by Bozena Cetnarowska, 2019
 Compounds and multi-word expressions in Russian by Ingeborg Ohnheiser, 2019
 Compounds and multi-word expressions in Spanish by Jesús Fernández-Domínguez, 2019

Syntax
Word coinage
Linguistic morphology